Muolen railway station is a railway station in Muolen, in the Swiss canton of St. Gallen. It is an intermediate stop on the Bodensee–Toggenburg line and is served by local trains only.

Services 
Muolen is served by the S1 of the St. Gallen S-Bahn:

 : half-hourly service between Schaffhausen and Wil via St. Gallen.

References

External links 
 

Railway stations in the canton of St. Gallen
Südostbahn stations